Petrovka is a rural locality (a selo) in Novoursayevsky Selsoviet, Bakalinsky District, Bashkortostan, Russia. The population was 11 as of 2010.

Geography 
It is located 35 km from Bakaly and 5 km from Novoursayevo.

References 

Rural localities in Bakalinsky District